The 1996–97 Xavier Musketeers men's basketball team represented Xavier University from Cincinnati, Ohio in the 1996–97 season. Led by head coach Skip Prosser, the Musketeers finished 23–6 (13–3 A-10) in the regular season, but lost in the quarterfinal round of the Atlantic 10 tournament. In the NCAA tournament, the Musketeers defeated Vanderbilt in the first round before losing to No. 2 seed UCLA, 96–83, in the round of 32.

Roster

Schedule and results

|-
!colspan=9 style=| Regular season

|-
!colspan=9 style=| Atlantic 10 Tournament

|-
!colspan=9 style=| NCAA Tournament

Rankings

References

Xavier
Xavier Musketeers men's basketball seasons
Xavier